The elections in 2012 were scheduled for seven Vidhan Sabhas and several local elections were also conducted. The 14th presidential election to elect the 13th president of the republic was also held in 2012. The tenure of the legislative assemblies of Goa, Gujarat, Himachal Pradesh, Manipur, Punjab, Uttar Pradesh and Uttarakhand were to expire during the year. The Election Commission of India issued the dates for the elections in Manipur, Punjab, Uttarakhand, Uttar Pradesh and Goa to take place in the first quarter of the year. Whereas the elections were held in Himachal Pradesh and Gujarat in the last quarter of the year.

In the first rounds of elections, Manipur and Punjab resulted in an incumbent government victory; while in Uttar Pradesh and Goa there was a heavy anti-incumbent victory; and Uttarakhand resulted in a hung assembly with an anti-incumbent plurality and in the second round, in Himachal Pradesh, BJP led by incumbent Chief Minister Prem Kumar Dhumal lost due to a huge anti-incumbency wave arising mainly out of corruption and lack of good governance. Congress veteran leader Virbhadra Singh took oath for record sixth term as next Chief Minister. In the western state of Gujarat incumbent Chief Minister Narendra Modi, in power since 2002, was running for his fourth term. Elections, held in two phases, reverted Bharatiya Janata Party (BJP), in power in Gujarat since 1995, with 119 seat out of 182.

Presidential election

The 14th indirect presidential election, in order to elect the 13th president, was held in India on 19 July 2012. On 22 July, Pranab Mukherjee was declared the winner. Mukheree gained 373,116 MP votes and 340,647 MLA votes for a total of 713,763 votes to win the election. He defeated P. A. Sangma, who got 145,848 MP votes and 170,139 MLA votes for a total of 315,987 votes. Mukherjee's win was aided by cross-voting.

Legislative Assembly elections

Goa 

The Indian National Congress has been governing Goa since 2005 with coalition partners, despite a controversial vote of confidence. It will go to the election with its ally, the Nationalist Congress Party, under Chief Minister Digambar Kamat. The main opposition BJP will go to the election under the leadership of former Chief Minister Manohar Parrikar. Corruption over mining is expected to be an issue in the election, as well as the BJP's attempts to reach out to Catholic voters.

The election took place on 3 March. The result was announced on 6 March.

The BJP emerged as the largest party and along with its coalition partner, the MGP, is set to form the next government. Manohar Parrikar is poised to be the chief ministerial candidate.

Manipur 

Okram Ibobi Singh of the Indian National Congress has led Manipur for two consecutive full terms. The main opposition consists of the Manipur People's Party, Bharatiya Janata Party, Nationalist Congress Party and Janata Dal – United.

There are 60 constituencies for which 2,357 polling stations are to be set up. In a total electorate of 17,40,820 people; 8,51,323 are men and 8,89,497 are women. The major issues are territorial integrity (which ensues from the entry of the Nagaland People's Front (the ruling party in neighbouring Nagaland) into the electoral politics of Manipur), the road blockades of National Highways 39 and 53 and the role of insurgents.

The election took place on 28 January. The result was announced on 6 March. as shown below:

Punjab

Punjab forms the northwest part of India. Its capital is Chandigarh, which is a Union territory and also a capital of Haryana.

In the political scenario, Punjab has three main parties divided into two factions, NDA and Congress. The NDA part consists of Shiromani Akali Dal (SAD) and Bhartiya Janata Party (BJP), while UPA is dominated mainly by the Congress. The SAD consists of several break-away factions of what once was a unified Akali Dal. BJP has mainly played a supporting role, mainly trying to consolidate the Hindu votes in favour of the alliance. Congress had an upper hand in the 2002 assembly elections, but SAD+BJP combine bounced back quite easily in the 2007 polls.

Punjab Elections 2012 Date:

The state will go to polls in a single phase on 30 Jan 2012 and Punjab election results will be declared on 4 March 2012.

Punjab has traditionally voted anti-incumbency in assembly elections. The incumbent government is an alliance of the Shiromani Akali Dal and the Bharatiya Janta Party under Chief Minister Parkash Singh Badal. The opposition Indian National Congress contested the election under the leadership of former Chief Minister Captain Amarinder Singh. The governance of the ruling coalition was the main election issue, besides the issue of the potential succession of the chief minister's son, Sukhbir Singh Badal.

A new entrant was the front Sanjha Morcha which consists of the newly formed People's Party of Punjab (PPP) led by former finance minister Manpreet Singh Badal. The Sanjha Morcha consists of the PPP, the Communist Party of India, the Communist Party of India - Marxist and the Akali Dal (Longowal).

The election took place on 30 January, with the result announced on 6 March. 
The result is shown below:

Uttarakhand 

Uttarakhand has turned out incumbent governments in the two elections held since its creation. The Bharatiya Janata Party fought the election under the leadership of its Chief Minister Bhuwan Chandra Khanduri. The main opposition Indian National Congress was led in the assembly by Harak Singh Rawat, but no Chief Ministerial candidate has been proposed. The interim tenure of former Chief Minister Ramesh Pokhriyal, which was marked by large-scale corruption accusations, was likely to be the main election issue.

The election took place on 30 January, with the result announced on 6 March. The INC's Vijay Bahuguna was appointed CM despite not having won a vote to be the party's leader in the legislative assembly. This came under criticism over corruption and caste as 24 of the 32 MLAs boycotted the swearing-in in support of the Rajput candidate Harish Rawat (whose caste is now a majority in Uttarakhand) as opposed to the Brahmin CM. Rawat also had the support of the outgoing leader of the opposition Harak Singh Rawat. The detailed result is given below:

Notably the incumbent CM B. C. Khanduri lost his seat. 
 Vijay Bahuguna Won Bye-Election held on 8 July from Sitarganj seat vacated due to resignation of BJP MLA Kiran Mandal.
Thus Increasing Congress Seats to 33
And Reducing BJP strength to 30

Uttar Pradesh 

Mayawati's Bahujan Samaj Party completed its first full-term; however, it came under criticism for corruption and publicity for the erection of statues and parks in honour of its chief minister. In the run-up to the election, the BSP fired some ministers and denied re-election to sitting legislators to avoid the corruption stigma. Another important issue was the proposed division into four smaller provinces to which the primary opposition party, the Samajwadi Party, is opposed.

The election was conducted in seven phases on 8, 11, 15, 19, 23, 28 February and 3 March. Voter turnout was nearly 59.5% voters exercising their franchise. The result was announced 6 March 2012, with Akhilesh Yadav being the Chief Minister-designate of UP. The detailed result is shown below:

Gujarat 

Polls in Gujarat took place in two phases: First phase on 13 December 2012 and second phase on 17 December 2012. The counting was held on 20 December 2012. The BJP have held a majority in the state since 1995 and went to the election under the leadership of Chief Minister Narendra Modi. The Indian National Congress was the main opposition, but did not specified a chief ministerial candidate.

Counting of votes completed on 20 December 2012 before evening which started from 8.00am across the Gujarat State at specified location in every district. Results of the election are as following:

Total Seats: 182
Results declared: 182 

The BJP lost in 16 contests by a margin of less than 2%. The Congress won 46% seats with a margin of less than 5%.

Himachal Pradesh

Himachal Pradesh has 68 assembly seats, with 17 reserved for SCs and 3 for ST.

Local elections

Municipal elections were held in various cities across Maharashtra on 16 February. In different cities elections results were mixed by party. The capital, Mumbai, resulted in a plurality for the Shiv Sena and the second largest city of Pune resulted in a Nationalist Congress Party plurality.

See also

 Elections in Uttar Pradesh
S. Y. Quraishi
V. S. Sampath

References

External links

Election Commission of India

2012 elections in India
India
2012 in India
Elections in India by year